

Events 
 January–June 
 January 6–20 – An English attempt led by Francis Drake to cross the Isthmus of Panama ends in defeat.
 January 28 – Francis Drake dies of dysentery off Portobelo.
 February 14 – Archbishop John Whitgift begins building his hospital at Croydon.
 April 9 – Siege of Calais: Spanish troops capture Calais.
 May 18 – Willem Barents leaves Vlie, on his third and final Arctic voyage.
 June – Sir John Norreys and Sir Geoffrey Fenton travel to Connaught, to parley with the local Irish lords.
 June 10 – Willem Barents and Jacob van Heemskerk discover Bear Island.
 June 17 – Willem Barents discovers Spitsbergen.
 June 24 – Cornelis de Houtman arrives in Banten, the first Dutch sailor to reach Indonesia..

 July–December 
 July 5 – Capture of Cádiz: An English fleet, commanded by Robert Devereux, 2nd Earl of Essex, and Lord Howard of Effingham, sacks Cádiz.
 July 14 – King Dominicus Corea (Edirille Bandara) is beheaded by the Portuguese in Colombo, Ceylon.
 August – David Fabricius discovers the star Mira.
 September 20 – Diego de Montemayor founds the city of Monterrey, Mexico.
 October 8–10 – The Union of Brest: The Ukrainian Church west of the Dnieper becomes known as the Ukrainian Rite of Catholicism, whereas the East officially renounces the authority of the Pope.
 October 18 – The Second Armada, a Spanish fleet sent to attack England in revenge for the raid on Cadiz, is wrecked in storms off Cape Finisterre; nearly 5,000 men and 44 ships are lost including five galleons
 October 19 – The Spanish galleon San Felipe founders in Japan, leading to 26 Christians being martyred the next year.
 October 24–26 – Battle of Keresztes: The Turks defeat a combined Habsburg–Transylvanian army.
 November 25 – The Cudgel War begins in Finland (at the time part of Sweden), when poor peasants rise up against the troops, nobles and cavalry who have taxed them.

 Date unknown 
 Elizabeth I of England decrees that all Africans should be removed from the British realm, in reaction to the food crisis.
 The first water closet, by Sir John Harington, is installed in a manor near Kelston in England.
 King Sigismund III Vasa moves the capital of Poland from Kraków to Warsaw.
 Sidney Sussex College, Cambridge, is founded.
 The Black Death hits parts of Europe.
 Dutch ships, commanded by Frederick de Houtman, reach Sumatra and Java for the first time.
 The fourth of a five year run of poor harvests, largely caused by the weather, a pattern typical of the last third of the century. This causes famine throughout Europe, which leads to food riots in Britain.
 Serb Uprising of 1596–97

Births

January–June
 January 1 – Elizabeth Ribbing, Swedish noble (d. 1662)
 January 13 – Jan van Goyen, Dutch painter (d. 1656)
 February 2
 Jacob van Campen, Dutch artist and architect of the Golden Age (d. 1657)
 Carew Mildmay, Member of the Parliament of England (d. 1676)
 February 3 – Brás Garcia de Mascarenhas, soldier, poet and writer (d. 1656)
 February 8 – Louis Giry, French lawyer, classical scholar (d. 1665)
 February 27 – Johan Stiernhöök, Swedish lawyer (d. 1675)
 March 1 – Duke Frederick of Saxe-Weimar, German prince and colonel (d. 1622)
 March 10 – Princess Maria Elizabeth of Sweden (d. 1618)
 March 11 – Isaac Elzevir, Dutch printer and publisher (d. 1651)
 March 16 – Ebba Brahe, Swedish countess (d. 1674)
 March 24 – Elizabeth of Hesse-Kassel, Duchess of Mecklenburg-Gütsrow (d. 1625)
 March 26 – Catherine Henriette de Bourbon, French noble (d. 1663)
 March 31 – René Descartes, French philosopher and mathematician (d. 1650)
 April 8 – Juan van der Hamen, Spanish artist (d. 1631)
 April 11 – Moritz Gudenus, German Catholic preacher (d. 1680)
 May 9 – Abraham van Diepenbeeck, Dutch painter (d. 1675)
 May 21 – John Louis II, Count of Nassau-Wiesbaden-Idstein (d. 1605)
 June 5 – Peter Wtewael, Dutch painter (d. 1660)
 June 6 – Michel Particelli d'Emery, French politician (d. 1650)
 June 23 – Johan Banér, Swedish field marshal in the Thirty Years' War (d. 1641)
 June 27 – Maximilian, Prince of Dietrichstein, German prince (d. 1655)
 June 29 – Emperor Go-Mizunoo of Japan (d. 1680)

July–December
 July 1 – Bertuccio Valiero, Doge of Venice (d. 1658)
 July 12 – Michael I of Russia, Russian Tsar (d. 1645)
 August 10 – Lorentz Eichstadt, German mathematician and astronomer (d. 1660)
 August 26 – Frederick V, Elector Palatine (d. 1632)
 August 18 – Jean Bolland, Belgian Jesuit, Founder of the Bollandist (d. 1665)
 August 19 – Elizabeth Stuart, later Queen of Bohemia (d. 1662)
 September
 James Shirley, English dramatist (d. 1666)
 Moses Amyraut, French Protestant theologian (d. 1664)
 September 3 – Nicola Amati, Italian luthier from Cremona (d. 1684)
 September 4 – Constantijn Huygens, Dutch Golden Age poet and composer (d. 1687)
 September 7 – John Casimir, Prince of Anhalt-Dessau (d. 1660)
 September 11 – Francis Eaton, Mayflower passenger and New World colonist (d. 1633)
 September 23 – Joan Blaeu, Dutch cartographer (d. 1673)
 October 1 – Cesare Dandini, Italian painter (d. 1657)
 October 5 – Pieter van Mierevelt, Dutch painter (d. 1623)
 October 18 – Edward Winslow, American Pilgrim leader (d. 1655)
 October 23 – Daniel Hay du Chastelet de Chambon, French mathematician (d. 1671)
 October 26 – Robert Coe, American colonial (d. 1689)
 November 1
 Albert, Count of Nassau-Dillenburg, joint ruler of Nassau-Dillenburg 1623–1626 (d. 1626)
 Pietro da Cortona, Italian painter (d. 1669)
 November 5 – Charles II, Duke of Elbeuf, French noble (d. 1657)
 November 6 – Jeanne Chezard de Matel, French mystic (d. 1670)
 November 21 – René de Voyer de Paulmy d'Argenson, French politician (d. 1651)
 December 12 – Sir Edward Osborne, 1st Baronet, English politician (d. 1647)
 December 13 – António Luís de Meneses, 1st Marquis of Marialva, Portuguese general and noble (d. 1675)
 December 21
 Thomas Francis, Prince of Carignano (d. 1656)
 Peter Mohyla, Moldavian Orthodox Metropolitan of Kiev and Galicia (d. 1646)
 December 24 – Leonaert Bramer, Dutch painter (d. 1674)

Date unknown
 Francesco Buonamici, Italian architect, painter and engraver (d. 1677)
 John Dury, Scottish-born Calvinist minister (d. 1680)
 Franz von Hatzfeld, Prince-Bishop of Würzburg (d. 1642)
 Lucas Holstenius, German humanist (d. 1661)
 Georg Jenatsch, Swiss political leader (d. 1639)
 Richard Mather, American clergyman (d. 1669)
 Horio Tadaharu, Japanese warlord (d. 1633)

Deaths 

 January 28 – Sir Francis Drake, English explorer, sea captain, privateer, navigator, slaver, pirate and politician (b.  1540)
 February 7 – George I, Landgrave of Hesse-Darmstadt (b. 1547)
 February 17 – Friedrich Sylburg, German classical scholar (b. 1536)
 February 19 – Blaise de Vigenère, French cryptographer, diplomat, scientist, and author (b. 1523)
 March 23 – Henry Unton, English diplomat (b. 1557)
 March 27 – Frederick IV of Liegnitz, German noble (b. 1552)
 April 4 – Philip II, Duke of Brunswick-Grubenhagen (b. 1533)
 May – Janet Fockart, Scottish merchant and moneylender
 May 5 – Catherine de Montpensier, politically active French duchess (b. 1552)
 May 6 – Giaches de Wert, Flemish composer (b. 1535)
 May 31 – John Lesley, Scottish bishop (b. 1527)
 June 10 – John Louis I, Count of Nassau-Wiesbaden-Idstein, Germany noble (b. 1567)
 July 10 – Alessandro Alberti, Italian painter (b. 1551)
 July 23 – Henry Carey, 1st Baron Hunsdon (b. 1526)
 August 11 – Hamnet Shakespeare, son of William Shakespeare (b. 1585)
 September 9 – Anna Jagiellon, queen of Poland (b. 1523)
 September 14 – Francisco de Toledo, Spanish Catholic cardinal (b. 1532)
 September 15 – Leonhard Rauwolf, German physician and botanist (b. 1535)
 October 3 – Florent Chrestien, French writer (b. 1541)
 October 26 – István Esterházy, Hungarian noble (b. 1572)
 November 1 – Pierre Pithou, French lawyer and scholar (b. 1539)
 November 10 – Peter Wentworth, English Puritan politician (b. 1530)
 November 29
 William Gibson (martyr), English Catholic martyr
 Venerable William Knight, English Catholic martyr (b. 1572)
 December 27 – Pietro Pontio, Italian music theorist and composer (b. 1532)
 date unknown
 Jean Bodin, French jurist (born 1530)
 Anna Wecker, German writer
 Hattori Hanzō, Japanese ninja under Tokugawa Ieyasu (b. 1541)
 probable – Henry Willobie, English poet (b. 1575)

References 

 
Leap years in the Gregorian calendar